Robert Carlson (April 11, 1905 – April 14, 1965) was an American sailor who competed in the 1932 Summer Olympics.

In 1932 he was a crew member of the American boat Gallant which won the silver medal in the 6 metre class.

External links
profile

1905 births
1965 deaths
American male sailors (sport)
Sailors at the 1932 Summer Olympics – 6 Metre
Olympic silver medalists for the United States in sailing
Medalists at the 1932 Summer Olympics